Heartbeat is the 13th country studio album by the American country music group The Oak Ridge Boys, released via MCA Records in 1987. It was the first album to feature Steve Sanders, who took William Lee Golden's place in March of that year. The album includes the singles "Time In" and "True Heart". The album reached number 20 on Top Country Albums.

"Love Without Mercy" was later a top 10 hit for Lee Roy Parnell in 1992.

Track listing

Personnel
Adapted from liner notes.

The Oak Ridge Boys
Duane Allen - lead vocals
Joe Bonsall - tenor vocals
Steve Sanders - baritone vocals
Richard Sterban - bass vocals

Musicians
John Barlow Jarvis - DX-7, piano
Russ Kunkel - drums, percussion
Mike Lawler - drum programming, synthesizer
Leland Sklar - bass guitar
Billy Joe Walker Jr. - acoustic guitar
Reggie Young - electric guitar

Chart performance

References

1987 albums
The Oak Ridge Boys albums
MCA Records albums
Albums produced by Jimmy Bowen